The Old River is a perennial river of the Port Phillip catchment, located in the Western District region of the Australian state of Victoria.

Location and features
The Old River rises below Mount Bullengarook, part of the Blackwood Ranges of the Great Dividing Range, in remote country within the Lerderderg State Park. The river flows generally south by west before reaching its confluence with the Lerderderg River below Mount Blackwood.

See also

References 

Melbourne Water catchment
Rivers of Greater Melbourne (region)